There are at least 126 named mountains in Madison County, Montana.
 A P A Mountain, el. 
 Bald Mountain, location unknown, el. 
 Baldy Mountain, el. 
 Beaverhead Rock, el. 
 Bell Peak, el. 
 Big Horn Mountain, el. 
 Big Mountain, el. 
 Big Sheep Mountain, el. 
 Black Butte, el. 
 Black Mountain, el. 
 Blaze Mountain, el. 
 Block Mountain, el. 
 Branham Peaks, el. 
 Brownback Mountain, el. 
 Bucks Nest, el. 
 Bulldog Mountain, el. 
 Cascade Mountain, el. 
 Cave Mountain, el. 
 Cedar Mountain, el. 
 Circle Mountain, el. 
 Cloudrest Peak, el. 
 Copper Mountain, el. 
 Dead Mountain, el. 
 Divide Peakl, el. 
 Dougherty Butte, el. 
 Dry Lake Mountains, el. 
 Dutchman Peak, el. 
 East Butte, el. 
 Echo Peak, el. 
 Elk Mountain, el. 
 Fan Mountain, el. 
 Finger Mountain, el. 
 Flatiron Mountain, el. 
 Flatiron Mountain, el. 
 Flattop Mountain, el. 
 Fossil Peak, el. 
 Freezeout Mountain, el. 
 Gallatin Peak, el. 
 Gold Butte, el. 
 Gold Hill, el. 
 Granite Mountain, el. 
 Granite Peak, el. 
 Grassy Mountain, el. 
 Hilgard Peak, el. 
 Hogback Mountain, el. 
 Hollowtop Mountain, el. 
 Horse Hill, el. 
 Horse Mountain, el. 
 Imp Peak, el. 
 Ironrod Hills, el. 
 Kid Mountain, el. 
 Koch Peak, el. 
 Lady of the Lake Peak, el. 
 Lakeshore Mountain, el. 
 Lava Mountain, el. 
 Lazyman Hill, el. 
 Leggat Mountain, el. 
 Lion Mountain, el. 
 Little Granite Peak, el. 
 Little Sheep Mountain, el. 
 Lobo Mesa, el. 
 London Hills, el. 
 London Peak, el. 
 Lone Mountain, el. 
 Lonesome Peak, el. 
 Long Mountain, el. 
 Maltbys Mound, el. 
 Manhead Mountain, el. 
 Marmot Mountain, el. 
 McCartney Mountain, el. 
 Middle Mountain, el. 
 Mine Peak, el. 
 Monument Hill, el. 
 Moose Butte, el. 
 Mount Bradley, el. 
 Mount Carey, el. 
 Mount Jackson, el. 
 Mount Jefferson, el. 
 No Man Peak, el. 
 Noble Peak, el. 
 Nutters Cathedral Peak, el. 
 Old Baldy Mountain, el. 
 Olson Peak, el. 
 Pioneer Mountain, el. 
 Point of Rocks, el. 
 Point of Rocks, el. 
 Porphyry Mountain, el. 
 Potosi Peak, el. 
 Queens Hill, el. 
 Ramshorn Mountain, el. 
 Red Hill, el. 
 Red Knob, el. 
 Red Mountain, el. 
 Red Mountain, el. 
 Sentinel Peak, el. 
 Shedhorn Mountain, el. 
 Sheep Mountain, el. 
 Sheep Mountain, el. 
 Silica Butte, el. 
 Skihi Peak, el. 
 Sliderock Mountain, el. 
 Smelter Mountain, el. 
 Snowcrest Mountain, el. 
 South Baldy Mountain, el. 
 Specimen Butte, el. 
 Sphinx Mountain, el. 
 Spuhler Peak, el. 
 Spur Mountain, el. 
 Stonehouse Mountain, el. 
 Strawberry Butte, el. 
 Sugar Loaf Mountain, el. 
 Sunrise Peak, el. 
 Sunset Peak, el. 
 Table Mountain, el. 
 Table Mountain, el. 
 Taylor Peaks, el. 
 The Helmet, el. 
 The Horn, el. 
 Thompson Peak, el. 
 Wallace Peak, el. 
 Ward Peak, el. 
 West Peak, el. 
 Windy Hill, el. 
 Woodward Mountain, el. 
 Woodward Mountain, el.

See also
 List of mountains in Montana
 List of mountain ranges in Montana

Notes

Madison